Gaola Union is an Union parishad of Mollahat Upazila, Bagerhat District in Khulna Division of Bangladesh. It has an area of 98.74 km2 (38.12 sq mi) and a population of 19,586.

References

Unions of Mollahat Upazila
Unions of Bagerhat District
Unions of Khulna Division